In Eastern Pennsylvania, the valley of the Panther Creek tributary of the Little Schuylkill River, a very small and relatively short mountain creek, was historically important due to its stranglehold on energy production, a key region central to the industrial development of the United States from the 1820s through the 1870s, and remained important as an energy producing region until decline of the Eastern U.S. Steel Industries in the 1960s.

Panther Creek Valley lies between and over the Anthracite ladened folds of the two long near parallel ridgelines, Nesquehoning and Pisgah Ridges forming the side walls and supplying the wealth which shipped from the Panther Creek Valley making the region historically important, as for several decades its land owners, Lehigh Coal & Navigation Company (LC&N) held a virtual monopoly on Anthracite produced and shipped not only to eastern U.S. Cities via the Lehigh Canal, but to transoceanic markets.

For perspective, LC&N must be viewed as a high-tech company of its day, as well as an early American conglomerate with efforts in many fields; a company which, from its start shortly after people learned to get Anthracite to burn, moved aggressively intelligently using emerging technologies to exploit the marked fuel shortage developing in post-revolutionary era cities and towns; wherein local wood bearing lands had gradually become scarce driving up the price of firewood, including charcoal needed for the fledgling North American iron foundries and dependent manufacturing industries from Boston to Richmond. 

The twin needs of heating buildings and heat for industrial processes began reshaping the world using technology by the middle of the eighteenth century in Europe—eventually giving rise to public and privately funded canal projects, the use of coal, pumps so coal could be mined, steam engines, and finally rail roads—all initially coming about, so people and industries could have and use heat, overcoming the energy crises of their respective areas & eras. While somewhat delayed in time from the older fuel crises plaguing Great Britain, and continental Europe, the growing fuel shortages in Eastern U.S. cities and young industrial systems from 1800 onwards applied the same pressures; causing the same solutions to be considered locally as well, and were widely debated as public policies as the American System and implemented in part by both local business interests, and the various state governments. Business interests and local governments in the young United States, were highly intertwined and there was much regional competitiveness. So there is little surprise to find such as the Pennsylvania, New York, and Maryland legislatures all put into place proactive programs to enhance transportation penetration to the new frontiers, the Ohio Country and Northwest Territories as American's looked west and plotted settlements, manufactories, and the mindset in business was still much influenced by Mercantilism and its beliefs of a static limited market, so were focused on growing industries using the internal markets of newly settled western lands.

Well before the presidential election of 1824 gave a renewed impetus to economic philosophies now called the American School, Philadelphia region private interests armed by newly publicized know-how of how to successfully ignite and sustain a clean burning fire using Anthracite, took notice of the fuel, its availability (it was discovered locally in the 1790s)... 

History of Pennsylvania
Industrial Revolution
Municipalities of the Anthracite Coal Region of Pennsylvania